Manay may refer to:

 Manay, Davao Oriental, a municipality in the Philippines
 Alcides Mañay (born 1927), Uruguayan footballer

See also